Vachagan III the Pious or Vachagan II (according to some authors) was the last Arsacid king of Caucasian Albania, ruling approximately from 485 to 523.

Background 
His lineage is uncertain. Murtazali Gadjiev considers him a son (or nephew) of the King of Kings Yazdegerd II and brother (or nephew) of Vache II. However, Aleksan Hakobyan refers to 5th century Armenian historian Elishe's mention of Vache as "a son inherited families", concluding that Vache was not heir but a second son. Hence, according to him, Vachagan was the son of elder but deceased son of Aswagen, thus a nephew of Vache II.

Reign 
Vache II previously ruled Caucasian Albania as a Sasanian vassal, but had been forced to abdicate after his revolt was crushed by Yazdegerd II's son and successor Peroz I in 462. Albania would remain kingless until 485, when Vachagan III was installed on the throne by Peroz's brother and successor Balash. This happened around the time of the signing of the Treaty of Nvarsak. The 6th-century Syriac author Zacharias Rhetor reports the siege of the Byzantine city of Amida by the Sasanian forces. After the city was captured in January 503, the victors started plundering the city and capturing prisoners. While this took place, mention is made of a "Christian prince of the country of Aran pleaded with the (Persian) king on behalf of one church, called the Church of the Forty Martyrs, and he spared it while it was full of people." Modern historian Murtazali Gadjiev deduces that the Christian prince described is "without a doubt" Vachagan III. Although sources don't give date for end of Vachagan's reign, Hakobyan puts it into 523, about the time of Kavad I's invasion of Georgia and abolishment of Iberian monarchy.

Family 
The History of the Country of Albania names two children of Vachagan—a son, Pantaleon, named after Saint Pantaleon, and a daughter named Khanchik. His wife, named Shushanik was probably a Mamikonian princess.

Legend 
Vachagan is presented in The History of the Country of Albania as a staunch Christian who ordered the Albanian aristocrats who had apostatized to return to their Christian beliefs. Furthermore, he also declared war against Zoroastrianism, paganism, idolatry and witchcraft. He opened religious schools in the country and recovered the Grigoris' and Saint Pantaleon's relics and buried them in a tomb within the Amaras Monastery with help of his uncle Khochkorik. Hakobyan considers chapter on Vachagan's life as a tale and an image of the ideal and the good Christian ruler. He is traditionally assumed to be buried in Yeghishe Arakyal Monastery.

Legacy 
Vachagan's rule in Albania was characterized by gradual Armenianization of the country, relying on Armenian feudals. Hakobyan believes this when Armenians came to consider Albania as an Armenian realm too. Later princely houses in the region, such as the Aranshahiks (authors such as Patrick Donabedian and Bagrat Ulubabyan are supporters of this theory) and the Hasan-Jalalyans claimed descent from him. Vachagan has become a symbol of renewal in Nagorno-Karabakh; there is a state "Order of Vachagan the Pious" in the Nagorno-Karabakh Republic. The Armenian tale Anahit and Vachagan is loosely based on Vachagan's life. The tale was retold as romantic prose by Ghazaros Aghayan (adapted into the film Anahit in 1947) and as a children's story by Robert San Souci.

References

Sources 

 
 
  
 

Arsacid kings of Caucasian Albania
5th-century Iranian people
6th-century Iranian people
Vassal rulers of the Sasanian Empire